Raspoutine may refer to:
 Grigori Rasputin
 Rasputin (1954 film), a 1954 French-Italian historical drama film
 Raspoutine (2011 film), a Franco-Russian historical film

See also
 Rasputin (disambiguation)